The Malaysia Makkal Sakti Party (abbrev: MMSP) is a political party in Malaysia that seeks to champion ethnic Malaysian-Indian issues. MMSP is an offshoot but unaffiliated of the apolitical NGO of Hindu Rights Action Force (HINDRAF) formed by its former coordinator R.S. Thanenthiran and his detractors faction aligned to the ruling Barisan Nasional (BN)'s United Malays National Organisation (UMNO) government then whoes actrocities the movement had been fighting against. It had even copied the NGO's slogan of People's Power (மக்கள் சக்தி / Makkal Sakti) as the party name.

The MMSP which was officially launched by the new Prime Minister Najib Abdul Razak then on 10 October 2009, has been allegedly sponsored by Barisan Nasional (BN) although the party had denied at the beginning, MMSP maintains friendly relations with BN though it is not an official party member of the BN coalition and even supported it openly in the 2018 general election (GE14). MMSP seeks to be admitted to the coalition and had stated it will not seek for election seats. Somehow the party decided other wise and has instead demanded to contest under BN in three parliamentary and seven state seats in Next Malaysian general election (GE15), after being considered a 'Friends of BN' party. In September 2021, BN chairman Ahmad Zahid Hamidi has announced that MMSP will be given seats to contest by the coalition in GE15. On 30 January 2022, after UMNO secretary-general Ahmad Maslan's meeting with MMSP which had pledged its supports for BN, also had given a positive indication on the party be given a seat to contest in the 2022 Johor state election.

General election results

See also
 HINDRAF
 Barisan Nasional
 Politics of Malaysia
 List of political parties in Malaysia

References

External links
Official website

Political parties in Malaysia
2009 establishments in Malaysia
Political parties established in 2009
Hindu political parties in Malaysia
Political parties of minorities
Indian-Malaysian culture
Dravidian political parties